Samburu Airport is an airport in Samburu County, Kenya.

Location
Samburu Airport  is located in Samburu National Reserve, Samburu County, Rift Valley Province, near the geographical center of the Republic of Kenya.

The geographic coordinates of this airport are:0° 32' 9.00"N, 37° 31' 48.00"E (Latitude:0.535835; Longitude:37.530000).

Overview
Samburu Airport is a small civilian airport, serving Samburu National Reserve.

Airlines and destinations

See also
 Samburu National Reserve
 Samburu County
 Rift Valley Province
 Kenya Airports Authority
 Kenya Civil Aviation Authority
 List of airports in Kenya
 List of airstrips in Samburu

References

External links
  Location of Samburu Airport At Google Maps
   Website of Kenya Airports Authority
 Airstrips in Samburu National Reserve 

Airports in Kenya
Airports in Rift Valley Province
Samburu County
Samburu National Reserve